Olufunmilayo I. Olopade, O.O.N. (born 1957 Nigeria) is a hematology oncologist, Associate Dean for Global Health and Walter L. Palmer Distinguished Service Professor in Medicine and Human Genetics at the University of Chicago. She also serves as director of the University of Chicago Hospital's Cancer Risk Clinic.

Life
Olufunmilayo Olopade was born in Nigeria in 1957 and was the fifth of six children born to an Anglican musician. She attended St Anne's School Ibadan for her secondary school education. Olopade first expressed interest in becoming a doctor at a young age because the Nigerian villages were scarce for doctors and medical resources, which were both in high demand.

She graduated from University of Ibadan, Nigeria, with a MBBS, in 1980.

She works closely with the Breast Cancer Research Foundation and has performed extensive clinical work surrounding the role of the BRCA1 and BRCA2 genes in the incidence of breast cancer in women of African descent.

She is a member of the American Association for Cancer Research, the American College of Physicians, the Nigerian Medical Association, the American Philosophical Society, and the Institute of Medicine.

Early career 

Olufunmilayo started her career in 1980 as a medical officer in the Nigerian Navy Hospital, after which she moved to the US where she worked at Cook County Hospital, Chicago between 1983 and 1987.

In 1991, Olufunmilayo joined the University of Chicago as assistant professor in hematology and oncology and presently serves as Dean of Global Health and Director of the Center for Clinical Cancer Genetics at the University of Chicago.

Awards 

 1975: Nigerian Federal Government Merit Award
 1978: Nigerian Medical Association Award for Excellence in Pediatrics
 1980: Nigerian Medical Association Award for Excellence in Medicine 
 1990: Ellen Ruth Lebow Fellowship
 1991: American Society for Clinical Oncology Young Investigator Award 
 1992: James S. McDonnell Foundation Scholar Award 
 2000:Doris Duke Distinguished Clinical Scientist Award 
 2003: Phenomenal Woman Award for work within the African-American Community 
 2005: Access Community Network's Heroes in Healthcare Award 
 2005 MacArthur Fellows Program
2015: Four Freedoms Award
 2017: Villanova University Mendel Medal
On Saturday, May 18, 2019, The Lincoln Academy of Illinois granted Olopade the Order of Lincoln award, the highest honor bestowed by the State of Illinois.
 2021: Member of the U. S. National Academy of Sciences.

Olufunmilayo Olopade was one out of the three African-Americans to receive the $500,000 award. This award was appointed by John D. and Catherine T. MacArthur Foundation. This “no strings attached” stipend grant was given as support for up to five years and was referred to as the “genius grant.” This grant allowed Olopade to continue her research on her groundbreaking discoveries on diseases and health concerns.

Family 
She married Christopher Sola Olopade, also a physician at the University of Chicago, in 1983; they have two daughters, including journalist Dayo Olopade, and one son.

Research 
Most of her research was on the susceptibility to cancer, which would then be used to adopt a more effective way of treating breast cancer among the African and African-American individuals and populations.

In 1987 at the University of Chicago, she found a gene that helped suppress tumor growth.

In 1992, Olopade helped found the University of Chicago's Center for Clinical Cancer Genetics. Here she found that African-American women often developed breast cancer at younger ages than white women.

In 2003, she began a new study looking at breast cancer and genetics from African women from Nigeria to Senegal and also African-American women in Chicago. By 2005 she found that 80% of tumors in African women did not need estrogen to grow compared to 20% of tumors in Caucasian the women. She also found that this was due to a different pattern of gene expression between the African women and the Caucasian women.

References

External links
"Olufunmilayo Olopade, MD, Physician Profile" UChicago Medicine
"The SciCom Interview: Olufunmilayo Olopade" 
"Dr. Olufunmilayo Olopade" , Tavis Smiley, July 10, 2009
" Is the Answer in Your Genes?" , Port of Harlem, Feb - Apr 2008
"Breast Cancer In Black Women May Be Connected To Neighborhood Conditions, Study Suggests", 'ScienceDaily, Mar. 20, 2008
"Olopade, Olufunmilayo ." Newsmakers 2006 Cumulation . . Retrieved February 27, 2020 from Encyclopedia.com: https://www.encyclopedia.com/books/culture-magazines/olopade-olufunmilayo.
https://orcid.org/0000-0002-9936-1599
https://www.linkedin.com/mwlite/in/olufunmilayo-funmi-olopade-b8bb1513

Nigerian scientists
1957 births
Nigerian oncologists
University of Ibadan alumni
University of Chicago faculty
MacArthur Fellows
Living people
Nigerian women medical doctors
Nigerian emigrants to the United States
American people of Yoruba descent
African-American scientists
American scientists
Yoruba women scientists
Yoruba women physicians
American women scientists
Cancer researchers
Nigerian women biologists
American women physicians
Nigerian women academics
Yoruba women academics
Recipients of the Four Freedoms Award
St Anne's School, Ibadan alumni
Members of the American Philosophical Society
Members of the United States National Academy of Sciences
Members of the National Academy of Medicine
Cancer in Nigeria